Cheng Chi-ya (born 26 December 1992) is a Taiwanese badminton player. She won her first international title at the 2013 Polish International Series in the women's singles event.

Achievements

BWF World Tour (2 runners-up) 
The BWF World Tour, announced on 19 March 2017 and implemented in 2018, is a series of elite badminton tournaments, sanctioned by Badminton World Federation (BWF). The BWF World Tour are divided into six levels, namely World Tour Finals, Super 1000, Super 750, Super 500, Super 300 (part of the HSBC World Tour), and the BWF Tour Super 100.

Mixed doubles

BWF International Challenge/Series (1 title, 3 runners-up) 
Women's singles

  BWF International Challenge tournament
  BWF International Series tournament

References

External links 
 

1992 births
Living people
People from Yunlin County
Taiwanese female badminton players
21st-century Taiwanese women